Anne de Laval (23 September 15051554), Princess of Taranto, was a French noblewoman and nominal pretender to the Kingdom of Naples. She was born at Vitré, Ille-et-Vilaine, the daughter of Guy XVI de Laval, count of Laval, and of Charlotte of Aragon, Princess of Taranto.

She was the only child of Charlotte to marry and leave heirs, thereby continuing the line of descent of Frederick of Naples. On 23 January 1521 she married François de la Trémoïlle, vicomte de Thouars. The marriage not only brought the La Trémoïlles the countship of Laval and the Neapolitan claim in 1521, but also the rank of princes étrangers at the French court. It is also said that she inherited the barony of Laz, as well, although Père Anselme's genealogy of her family makes no mention of it.  She died at Craon, aged 48 or 49.

Her eldest son, Louis III de La Trémoille, became the first duc de Thouars in 1599, while her second son, Georges, and third son, Claude, founded the cadet branches of the marquises de Royan and the ducs de Noirmoutier, respectively.

Ancestry

Notes

References 
  

1505 births
1554 deaths
People from Vitré, Ille-et-Vilaine
Anne
French princesses
Anne
Princesses of Taranto
16th-century French people
16th-century French women
People of Byzantine descent